Ulrich Rippert (born 1951) is a German politician of Trotskyism and journalist. He is party leader of the German party Sozialistische Gleichheitspartei (SGP). This party is a member of the International Committee of the Fourth International. Rippert is a member of the World Socialist Web Site International Editorial Board. He is the father of two daughters and lives in Berlin.

External links 
 World Socialist Web Site
 An appeal from PSG chairman Ulrich Rippert

References 

German Trotskyists
Living people
1951 births